The Green Group in the European Parliament was a Green political group with seats in the European Parliament between 1989 and 1999.

History
In 1989 the Rainbow Group split, with the Greens forming a group called "The Green Group in the European Parliament", and the Regionalists remaining within a continuing but diminished Rainbow Group. The Greens and Regionalists stayed within separate parliamentary groups until 1999, when the two Groups reunited under the European Greens–European Free Alliance banner.

Nomenclature
The group's formal name was "The Green Group in the European Parliament", not the "Green Group in the European Parliament". Unlike other groups, "The" was part of the formal name of the group.

External links
G/EFA on Europe Politique
Development of Political Groups in the European Parliament
Political Groups of the European Parliament

References

Former European Parliament party groups
Green politics

sv:De gröna i Europaparlamentet